is a former Japanese football player.

He has played for Yokohama and Mito HollyHock.

Club statistics

References

External links

1983 births
Living people
University of Tsukuba alumni
Association football people from Saitama Prefecture
Japanese footballers
J1 League players
J2 League players
Yokohama FC players
Mito HollyHock players
Association football defenders